The Deputy Assistant Secretary of the Navy for International Programs (DASN (IP)) is an office of the United States Department of the Navy. The DASN (IP) reports to the Assistant Secretary of the Navy for Research, Development and Acquisition, and serves as the principal adviser to the assistant secretary on issues involving international programs.  

The current DASN (IP) is Rear Admiral Anthony E. “Tony” Rossi.

References

External links
 DASN (IP)/NIPO website

Office of the Secretary of the Navy